Marystown is a town in the province of Newfoundland and Labrador, Canada, with a population of around 5,000. Situated 306 km from the province's capital, St. John's, it is on the Burin Peninsula. Until the early 1990s, its economy was largely based on shipbuilding, and it is due in part to this that the town experienced a population increase of 295% in just over a decade. The town was also dependent on the fish plant for employment.

Though the shipyard still holds a presence in the town, residents have had to look elsewhere for economic subsistence in the last decade or so. The closure of the fish plants in Newfoundland has also had its hand in the decline in economic subsistence. Mortier Bay also served a strategic role during World War II, and was the site selected to evacuate the Royal Family and regroup the British Navy in the event of German invasion of Britain. Currently fish farming and the shipyard remain important to the local economy; in fact, construction of the world's largest fish hatchery, the Grieg NL project, began at the town in 2019.

Geography
Marystown lies on hummocky pyroclastic volcanic rock of mixed composition. This rock is overlain by very stony sandy loam glacial till which has a classic podzol soil profile in undisturbed areas; this is named as Toslow soil association. The vegetation at the time of the soil survey was a barren dominated by sphagnum mosses, heath-type shrubs, and mountain alder. Forest vegetation, mostly of coniferous trees, has developed in many areas around town as can be seen on Google Street View.

Demographics 

Religion
While the town contains a diverse mixture of churches of varying denominations, the town is almost entirely Christian. The information presented from a 2001 census from Statistics Canada indicates that 68% of the population is Roman Catholic.

 Roman Catholic; Sacred Heart Parish
 United; Calvary United Church
 Anglican; St. Michael's Church;St. Mary's Church
 Salvation Army; Faith and Hope Corps
 Pentecostal; Calvary Pentecostal Church
 Seventh-Day Adventist; Marystown Seventh-Day Adventist Church

Sacred Heart Parish
Established in 1910, the original edifice, constructed in the early 1900s had to be reconstructed in the late 1970s due to a fire. In more recent years, the church has received much attention from the news when a family of illegal immigrants from Israel resided there as a place of sanctuary. Alexi and Angela Portnoy and their five children (the three youngest of whom were born in Canada) stayed in the church's basement for a total of 962 days while seeking citizenship status. The family was ultimately deported to Israel, but their supporters vowed to try to help the family to return.

Calvary Pentecost Church
Establishment of the church began in 1956. It was not until 1958 that the first Pentecost church in Marystown was officially completed. Since then there have been three Pentecost churches erected in the Marystown area: the original edifice in 1958, the second in 1974, and the current church that was built in 1995.

Seventh-Day Adventist Church
It wasn't until the 1970s that the Seventh Day Adventists established a significant population in Marystown. The construction of the first church began in 1985 along with a Seventh-Day school. Though the construction was completed much earlier, 1987 denotes the official church opening.

Economy

Workforce 
By 2018, it was recognized that the region exhibited significant unemployment, but also that the potential workforce was not sufficient to support shipyard and aquaculture expansions envisioned in subsequent years. This led to a call for loosening immigration regulations so that the workforce could be expanded with immigrant workers.

Shipyard workers are represented by at least two unions, Marine Workers Federation - Unifor Local 20 and the Marine Office and Technical Employees Unit.

Shipbuilding and aquaculture 

Shipbuilding began in Marystown not long after it was settled in the early 1800s. The earliest records of shipbuilding in the area date to 1908, and Marystown's first shipyard was constructed in 1918 north of the town.

The Marystown Co-operative shipyard opened in 1939 was destroyed by fire in 1941; originally committed to building fishing trawlers, it was converted to minesweeper construction for World War II. Work at the site began in 1938 when the Newfoundland Commission of Government established the first government shipyard. The Marystown Shipyard was established by the Newfoundland government in 1959 for the construction of longliners, "motor-powered decked vessels ranging from 35 to 65 feet in length." This facility was operated as a Crown Asset until the 1980s, when it was privatized.

Construction of a nearby additional shipbuilding facility began in 1966 and it was opened in 1967 by the shipping company Canadian Vickers, initially for the construction and repair of fishing vessels. This facility has changed owners and names over the years; the initial owner was Newfoundland Marine Works Ltd., until 1973. Ownership changed hands to Marystown Shipping Enterprises Ltd., which held title until 1978, when ownership changed to Marystown Shipyard Ltd. In response to a decline in the cod fishery industry, the Newfoundland government refurbished the shipyard in 1992. Ownership left Canada when the American company Friede Goldman Ltd. bought the facility in 1998, and remained in American hands when ownership changed again in 2002 to Kiewit Offshore Services Ltd. By 2019, the shipyard had been idle for four years and was acquired by Marbase Marystown Inc. (usually just Marbase), under a 20-year lease with the intention of establishing a service hub supporting regional aquaculture, the first of its kind in Canada.  Marbase is a partnership between one Newfoundland businessman, Paul Antle, and the Norwegian company Amar Group AS.

In 2019, Marbase Cleanerfish Ltd., began work on a commercial lumpfish hatchery in Marystown, with an anticipated customer base of Atlantic salmon farm operators. As of 2020, government approval of the work in relation to environmental impact had not yet been completed.

Fish plant
For many years the fish plant in Marystown created hundreds of jobs in the small town. Originally operated by Fishery Products International (FPI) the plant was sold to Ocean Choice International (OCI) in 2007. In 2011, the plant employed roughly 240 people seasonally. In November 2011, provincial government-appointed auditors backed up claims by OCI that they were losing millions of dollars each year operating the fish plant. On 2 December 2011, the company announced that they would permanently close their Marystown and Port Union fish plants and invest money into other plants in the province. Demolition of the plant began in 2015.

Attractions

Attractions to the town include:
Marystown Heritage Museum
The Shrine of Marymount (statue of the Virgin Mary)
Marystown Public Library
MADD Burin Peninsula Memorial Gardens

Shrine of Marymount
The Shrine of Marymount, or The Marymount as it is locally referred to, is one of the largest Marian statues erected in Newfoundland. It stands at fifteen feet tall, and overlooks the entirety of Marystown, sitting at one of the highest points in the area.

Sports 
Despite being in a province reporting one of the highest obesity rates in Canada, Marystown has sport enthusiasts in disciplines including softball, soccer, swimming, track and field and hockey. Marystown has many attractions for both residents and visitors:

 Swimming pool
 Professional track and field complex (home of the Mariners Athletics Club {MAC})
 Two softball diamonds: The Kinsmen Field and The Lions Field
 Soccer pitch (home to the 2004 Challenge Cup Champions "Marystown United")
 Ice rink/live entertainment complex
 Scenic walking trails
 YMCA facility

The urban centre is surrounded by rolling hills and densely wooded areas, as a result Marystown is frequented by hunting, fishing, camping and ATV enthusiasts.        Also including a work-in-progress splash pad. ''As of 2021'' at the Marystown track and field complex.

Education 
Marystown and surrounding area is home to four public schools, Marystown Central High School, Sacred Heart Academy, Pearce Junior High, and Donald C. Jamieson Academy. Post secondary institutions include two public trade-colleges, College of the North Atlantic, and Keyin College.

Marystown's public schools are serviced under the Newfoundland and Labrador English School District.

Media

Radio
Marystown currently receives numerous radio stations including:
 FM 88.3: CHCM ("VOCM"), news/talk/classic hits
 FM 90.3: CBNM, CBC Radio One
 FM 91.7: CBN-FM-5, CBC Radio 2
 FM 96.3: CHOZ ("OZFM"), Top 40
 FM 99.5: VOAR-2-FM ("Lighthouse FM"), Christian radio/music

Television
 Channel 5 - CBC Television
 Channel 11 - NTV

Print
Marystown is the home of The Southern Gazette, a newspaper that covers the entire Burin Peninsula.

Notable people
 Kaetlyn Osmond (skating arena and part of route 210 named in her honour)

See also

 List of cities and towns in Newfoundland and Labrador

References

External links
Town of Marystown Website

Populated coastal places in Canada
Towns in Newfoundland and Labrador